Mohamed Abdel Salam may refer to:
 Mohamed Abd El-Salam, Egyptian handball player
 Mohamed Abdel Salam (footballer) (born 1997), Egyptian footballer
 Mohamed Abdelsalam (born 1987), Egyptian footballer